N(4)-(beta-N-acetylglucosaminyl)-L-asparaginase is an enzyme that in humans is encoded by the AGA gene.

Aspartylglucosaminidase is an amidohydrolase enzyme involved in the catabolism of N-linked oligosaccharides of glycoproteins. It cleaves asparagine from N-acetylglucosamines as one of the final steps in the lysosomal breakdown of glycoproteins.  The lysosomal storage disease aspartylglycosaminuria is caused by a deficiency in the AGA enzyme.

References

External links

Further reading

External links